Mariano Rudi (born 2 June 1990 in Genoa) is an Italian professional football player currently playing for Pro Patria.

He made his professional debut in the 2009/10 season for the Lega Pro Prima Divisione team Aurora Pro Patria 1919.

In January 2012 he joined Lecco, with Luca Viviani moved to opposite direction.

On 31 August 2013 he joined Savona F.B.C.

References

External links
 

1990 births
Living people
Italian footballers
Aurora Pro Patria 1919 players
Pisa S.C. players
Association football midfielders